The 2013 William Jones Cup was the 35th tournament of the William Jones Cup that took place at the Xinzhuang Gymnasium in New Taipei, Republic of China (commonly known as Taiwan) from July 6 to July 15. Iran's national basketball team went on to win their fourth title by winning all of their seven games in the tournament.

Due to the 2013 Guang Da Xing No. 28 incident, Taiwanese officials withdrew its invitation for the Philippines men's national basketball team, the defending champions of the tournament, citing that the withdrawal of the invitation would ensure the safety of the Philippine representatives following the diplomatic incident between the Philippines and the host country (Taiwan). Egypt's national basketball team replaced the Philippines and made its debut in the tournament.

Men's tournament

Team standings 

Notes:
Tiebreaker based on head-to-head record.
All of the games involving Lebanon were forfeited after they were suspended indefinitely by FIBA due to unresolved conflicts within the country's national basketball federation.

Results 
All times in UTC+8.

Awards

References

External links 
  

2013
2013–14 in Taiwanese basketball
2013–14 in American basketball
2013–14 in Asian basketball
2013 in African basketball